Ross Gray may refer to:

 Ross F. Gray (1920–1945), American Medal of Honor recipient
 Ross Gray (politician) (1897–1968), Canadian member of Parliament
 Ross Gray (footballer) (born 1992), Scottish footballer